The Public Service Enterprise Group (PSEG) is a publicly traded diversified energy company headquartered in Newark, New Jersey, US established in 1985 with a legacy dating back to 1903.

The company's largest subsidiary is Public Service Electric and Gas Company (PSE&G). The Public Service Electric and Gas Company is a regulated gas and electric utility company established in 1928 serving the state of New Jersey and it is New Jersey's oldest and largest investor owned utility company; it was originally a subsidiary of the New-Jersey-based Public Service Corporation.

History
PSE&G/PSEG origins date back to 1903 with the defunct Public Service Corporation.

Public Service Electric and Gas Company

The Public Service Electric and Gas Company, commonly referred to as PSE&G, is the primary subsidiary of the Public Service Enterprise Group (PSEG) and was established in 1928.

The Public Service Corporation was formed in 1903 by combining more than 400 gas, electric and transportation companies in New Jersey. In 1928, the corporation merged its electric and gas utilities into a single company, PSE&G. Also in 1928, Public Service Coordinated Transport was formed as an umbrella for the transit businesses. The parent Public Service Corporation was dissolved in 1948 and PSE&G became an independent company, with Public Service Coordinated Transport as a subsidiary.

PSCT was renamed Transport of New Jersey in 1971, and sold to New Jersey Transit in 1980, leaving PSE&G exclusively in the utility business.

Public Service Enterprise Group
The Public Service Enterprise Group (PSEG) was established in 1985 to take control of the Public Service Electric and Gas Company (PSE&G).

In 1989, Public Service Enterprise Group established the Enterprise Diversified Holdings Inc. (now PSEG Energy Holdings) to begin consolidation of unregulated businesses. In 2000, Public Service Enterprise Group split off the PSE&G subsidiary's unregulated national power generation assets to form PSEG Power, while the PSE&G subsidiary continued operating in New Jersey as a regulated gas and electric delivery company.

In June 2005, the acquisition of PSEG by Exelon, a Chicago and Philadelphia based utility conglomerate, was approved by the Federal Energy Regulatory Commission; however, the deal was never consummated and eventually dissolved after it became clear that it would not win state regulatory approval from the New Jersey Board of Public Utilities.

In 2009, PSEG began installing solar panels on 200,000 utility poles in its service area in a project costing $773 million, the largest such project in the world. The Solar 4 All project increased the capacity for renewable energy in New Jersey and was completed in 2013. In addition, PSEG is building four solar farms in Edison, Hamilton, Linden, and Trenton.

In August 2020, about 400,000 customers on Long Island and 490,000 customers in New Jersey under the jurisdiction of PSEG were left without power as a result of Hurricane Isaias. Although some got power back within hours of Isaias, some had to wait days for power to be restored. As of August 10, 2020, around 42,000 Long Island customers were still without power, while around 20,000 New Jersey customers were without power. State and local officials have called for more accountability from PSEG after the storm passed. Governor Andrew Cuomo threatened to take away operating licenses from PSEG and ConEdison, while Nassau County Executive Laura Curran along with several state senators called for reimbursement to customers for their failure to respond quickly.

Operations 

Public Service Enterprise Group has three operating subsidiaries:
 Public Service Electric and Gas (PSE&G)
 PSEG Long Island
 PSEG Power

Public Service Electric and Gas 

PSE&G serves the population in an area consisting of a  diagonal corridor across the state from Bergen to Gloucester Counties. PSE&G is the largest provider of gas and electric service, servicing 1.8 million gas customers and 2.2 million electric customers in more than 300 urban, suburban and rural communities, including New Jersey's six largest cities.

PSEG's transmission line voltages are 500 kilovolts (kV), 345 kV, 230 kV and 138 kV with interconnections to utilities in Pennsylvania, Delaware, and New York. The company's subtransmission voltages are 69 kV and 26 kV. PSEG's distribution voltages are 13.2 kV and 4.16 kV.

PSEG Power 
PSEG Power has four main subsidiaries: PSEG Nuclear, PSEG Fossil, PSEG Energy Resources & Trade, and PSEG Power Ventures.

PSEG Nuclear operates three nuclear reactors at two facilities in Lower Alloways Creek Township. PSEG owns one reactor at Hope Creek Nuclear Generating Station and operates two reactors at Salem Nuclear Power Plant where PSEG Nuclear holds a 57 percent stake (in partnership with Exelon Corporation). The three plants receive $300 million per year in subsidies. Exelon also operates two reactors at Peach Bottom Nuclear Generating Station in a 50/50 joint venture with PSEG.

PSEG Long Island 
PSEG Long Island provides electricity to 1.1 million customers in Nassau and Suffolk counties, and the Rockaway Peninsula of Queens, part of New York City. This system operates under an agreement with the Long Island Power Authority, the state agency that owns the system, that went into effect January 1, 2014. PSEG was selected to essentially privatize LIPA after the controversies surrounding Hurricane Sandy, taking over near complete control of the system including its brand name, whereas before this agreement only a number of functions were performed by the private sector and the system was operated under the LIPA name.

Environmental record

In 2001, NOAA presented PSEG with The Walter B. Jones Memorial and NOAA Excellence Awards in Coastal and Ocean Resource Management in the category of Excellence in Business Leadership for its Estuary Enhancement Program.

See also
 Atlantic Nuclear Power Plant
 Public Service Railway
 Newark Public Service Terminal

References

External links

 

 
Electric power companies of the United States
Non-renewable resource companies established in 1903
Companies based in Newark, New Jersey
Companies listed on the New York Stock Exchange
Companies in the Dow Jones Utility Average
1903 establishments in New Jersey
American companies established in 1903